Michaela Monzoni Hasalíková (born ) is a Czech female former volleyball player, playing as a central. She was part of the Czech Republic women's national volleyball team. She competed at the 2013 Women's European Volleyball Championship. On club level she played for Lokomotiv Baku and Olympiacos.

References

External links
 profile at FIVB
 profile at CEV

1984 births
Living people
Czech women's volleyball players
Olympiacos Women's Volleyball players
Place of birth missing (living people)
Expatriate volleyball players in Greece
Expatriate volleyball players in Azerbaijan
Czech expatriate sportspeople in Greece
Czech expatriate sportspeople in Azerbaijan